Otho Holland Williams (March 1, 1749 – July 15, 1794) was a Continental Army officer from Maryland in the American Revolutionary War. He participated in many battles throughout the war in the New York, New Jersey  and Southern theaters, eventually ending his career as a brigadier general.

Born in rural Prince George's County, Maryland, Williams spent his childhood on Springfield Farm near present-day Williamsport. He was orphaned at age thirteen and was put in the care of his father's brother-in-law, Mr. Ross. Williams took an apprenticeship under Mr. Ross and studied his profession in the Clerk's office of Frederick, eventually taking charge of the office. At age eighteen, Williams moved to Baltimore and undertook a similar trade. Williams returned to Frederick in 1774 and entered into a commercial life.

In response to Congress's call for soldiers at the outbreak of the American Revolutionary War in the spring of 1775, Williams joined a Continental Army rifle unit as a commissioned officer. Soon thereafter, he and his unit marched off to the Siege of Boston. Seeing his first significant combat action in late 1776 at the Battle of Fort Washington, Williams was captured by the British and imprisoned in New York. He was released in early 1778 and returned to the Continental Army as colonel of the 6th Maryland Regiment, a position he had acquired during his captivity. From thereafter, Williams led his regiment through much of the southern campaign, most notably in the battles of Camden, Guilford Court House, and Eutaw Springs. Near the end of the War, Williams was sent by his commanding officer General Greene with documents to Congress and was promoted to brigadier general in 1782.

After the war, Williams later served as an associate justice for Baltimore County, and as the first commissioner of the Port of Baltimore. He returned to Springfield Farm in 1787, bought the house and the surrounding land, and began laying out the town of Williamsport.  In 1792, Washington offered Williams to be brigadier general of the army, though he declined due to his failing health. Williams died two years later in 1794 while travelling to Sweet Springs, Virginia.

Early life
Otho Holland Williams was born on March 1, 1749, the third generation of his family born on the North American Continent, his ancestors having emigrated from Wales.  For the first year of his life, he lived with his parents Joseph and Prudence Williams in Prince George's County until the family settled at the mouth of the Conecocheague near present-day Williamsport. His family home was Springfield Farm, listed on the National Register of Historic Places in 1974. Shortly before Joseph Williams death, he placed his thirteen-year-old son into the care of his brother-in-law Mr. Ross, who worked in the clerk's office in Frederick County.  After studying the duties of the office, Williams took charge of the office himself before moving to Baltimore for similar employment at the age of eighteen.  In the spring of 1774, Williams returned to Frederick and entered into commercial life.

Early War
On June 14, 1775, upon the call for soldiers by the Continental Congress, Williams joined Capt. Thomas Price's Independent Rifle Company of Maryland as first lieutenant. The company then marched to the Siege of Boston. Soon after the company's arrival in Boston, Williams was promoted to the command of the company.  By order of the Continental Congress on June 27, 1776, the rifle company was integrated into the Maryland and Virginia Rifle Regiment, with Hugh Stephenson as colonel, Moses Rawlings as lieutenant colonel and Williams as major.

The regiment did not see much action until the Battle of Fort Washington, where Williams was taken prisoner by the British.  He was taken to New York, where due to his rank he was permitted to go at large on his parole.  During this time in New York, it was common for British officers to amuse themselves by insulting American prisoners with pointed questions such as "What Trade were you of before you entered the service?"  When a high ranking British officer asked this question of Williams he replied:

It is suggested that the officer offended by this retort informed William Phillips—then in command of the New York garrison—that Williams was sending military information to George Washington contrary to the terms of his parole.  Williams was promptly arrested and confined to a sixteen square foot (1.5 square meter) room without ventilation in the city's provost jail which he shared with Ethan Allen.  Due to possible maltreatment by his captors and malnourishment, his health was affected to the point where he never fully recovered from his imprisonment.

After the surrender of General John Burgoyne after the Battles of Saratoga, Williams was exchanged on January 16, 1778.  During his imprisonment, Williams had been  promoted to colonel and given command of the 6th Maryland Regiment of the Maryland Line.  Shortly after his release, he stated in a letter to the governor of Maryland that the regiment contained "...not above a hundred effective men... and that those are very indifferently clothed."  He further stated: "I heartily desire to join the army as soon as possible but certainly it had better be reinforced by a regiment without a colonel than by a colonel without a regiment." After joining Washington's army shortly before the Battle of Monmouth he learned that the regiment was noted for a looseness of discipline and was unable to stand with others in the line during battle. Soon after he took effective command, the 6th Maryland Regiment became known as the equal, if not superior, to any in the whole army.

Southern campaign

After the unsuccessful attempt to capture Savannah, Georgia, under the command of General Benjamin Lincoln, the Southern Department of the Continental Army retreated to Charleston, South Carolina.  General Sir Henry Clinton moved his forces, surrounded the city where Lincoln's army was located and cut off any chance of relief for the Continental Army.  Prior to his surrender, Lincoln had been able to get messages to General Washington and Congress requesting aid.  At the end of April 1780, Washington dispatched General Johann de Kalb with 1,400 Maryland and Delaware troops.  The Maryland Line made up a large portion of this force, with Williams serving in the post of Adjutant general to General De Kalb.

General de Kalb's forces took almost a month to descend the Chesapeake Bay and did not arrive in Petersburg, Virginia, until the middle of June, almost a month after Lincoln had surrendered his army. The Continental Congress appointed Horatio Gates to command the Southern Department. He assumed command on July 25, 1780, and immediately marched into South Carolina with the intent of engaging the British Army, now under the command of Charles Cornwallis. Williams served as Deputy Adjutant-General under Gates.

Battle of Camden

After brief aggressive maneuvering which threatened the British position in the Carolinas, Cornwallis moved his forces to engage the American forces.  The two armies met in the Battle of Camden on August 16, 1780, six miles (9.5 km) north of Camden, South Carolina.  Due to several tactical errors on the part of General Gates, Cornwallis achieved a decisive victory.  Deserted by their commander and facing opposition on all sides, the Continental Army was forced to retreat.  During this engagement, Williams had been stationed to the rear of the army and was unable to contribute until the end  and General de Kalb was mortally wounded.  Prior to his death three days later, de Kalb paid a glowing tribute to the Maryland Troop under his command.

Battle of Guilford Court House

After the successful retreat across the Dan River, during which Williams led his men during many highly successful rear guard actions checking the enemy's advance and baffling every British attempt to bring the American army into a general engagement, General Nathanael Greene chose to offer battle to General Cornwallis's forces on March 15, 1781, on ground of his own choosing at Guilford Court House, inside the city limits of present-day Greensboro, North Carolina.

After the British forces had broken Greene's first line made up of North Carolina Militia and the second line made up of Virginia Militia they threatened the third line made up by the 1st Maryland Regiment, under the command of Colonel John Gunby, and the 2nd Maryland Regiment. The Brigade of Guards, under the command of a Colonel Stewart, broke through the 2nd Maryland Regiment, captured two field pieces and threatened the rear of the 1st Maryland forces whom were already engaged with sizable force under the command of a Colonel Webster.

The 1st Maryland Regiment charged and swept Webster's forces from the field.  They then turned to face the oncoming guards unit.  After a brief exchange of musket fire, in which 1st Maryland's commander's horse was shot from under him, the 1st Maryland Regiment charged the Guards unit who were quickly routed.

Greene, not able to see this part of the battle from his vantage point, had already ordered a retreat.  Thus, unsupported, the Maryland troops were soon forced to withdraw. During this retreat the 6th Maryland Regiment under Williams again acted as the rear guard of the army and is credited with holding off the British forces allowing Greene to move his forces to safety.  In recognition of Williams' gallantry, Greene appointed him to the post of Adjutant general of the Army.

Battle of Eutaw Springs

The Battle of Eutaw Springs can be divided into two distinct engagements.  During the first action, Greene had given the following order to Williams:

The 6th Maryland Regiment advanced and broke the British line forcing them to fall back several miles and allowing the Continental Army to gain control of the British Camp.  The Americans then began to pillage the camp which allowed time for the British to form a new line anchored by a stone house that the Continental Army was unable to move later in the day.

Near the close of the War, he was sent by General Greene with dispatches to congress and on May 9, 1782, promoted to brigadier general.

Later life
After the War, Williams returned to Maryland and settled in Baltimore.  He was soon appointed commissioner of the port by the governor of Maryland, an appointment that was renewed when George Washington assumed the Presidency of the United States. He was also admitted as an original member of The Society of the Cincinnati of Maryland in November 1783 and was later elected as the first assistant secretary general of the National Society at its first general meeting in 1784.

In 1786 he married his wife, Mary, the second daughter of William Smith with whom he had four sons. In the year following his marriage, Williams bought his father's house near the Potomac River and dedicated himself to improving the farm and laying out the town of Williamsport, Maryland, which was named in his honor. Williams wanted the capital of the United States to be located in Williamsport and wrote a letter to Washington to that effect on November 1, 1790, enclosing a map of the town.

Washington thought so highly of Williams that in 1792, when Daniel Morgan refused the rank of brigadier general of the American Army, the president had Henry Knox, the United States Secretary of War, write Williams asking him to accept the position. The position would have made Williams the second in command of the American Army, but citing poor health and no ambition for the position, Williams declined the appointment. However, on December 21, 1792, Williams accepted the Maryland State Legislature's invitation for him to serve as an associate justice for Baltimore County.

His health deteriorating, Williams was induced to try the "sea airs" and in 1793 journeyed to Barbados which afforded him some benefits.  In 1794 upon reaching Woodstock on his way to Sweet Springs, Virginia, Williams became too ill to travel.  On Tuesday, July 15, 1794, at the age of 46, Otho Holland Williams died.  His remains were interred under a simple monument on the summit of a hill on his Williamsport homestead.  His wife died one year later leaving their children orphaned and under the care of her father.

Footnotes

References

Maryland Historical Society (1927). "A muster roll of Captain Thomas Price's Company of Rifle-Men in the service of the United Colonies." Maryland Historical Magazine 22, 275-283.

 Metcalf, Bryce (1938). Original Members and Other Officers Eligible to the Society of the Cincinnati, 1783–1938: With the Institution, Rules of Admission, and Lists of the Officers of the General and State Societies Strasburg, VA: Shenandoah Publishing House, Inc.

External links
 The Society of the Cincinnati
 The American Revolution Institute

1749 births
1794 deaths
Continental Army officers from Maryland
People of Maryland in the American Revolution
Continental Army generals
People from Prince George's County, Maryland
People from Washington County, Maryland